Arnold Payne (born 17 October 1972) is a Zimbabwean athlete. He was in his country's team in the 4 x 400m relay in the Men's 4 x 400 metres relay in the 1995 World Championships in Athletics.

References

1972 births
Living people
Zimbabwean male sprinters
Athletes (track and field) at the 1994 Commonwealth Games
Athletes (track and field) at the 1998 Commonwealth Games
Commonwealth Games competitors for Zimbabwe